Bir Malla, also known as Bira Malla was the forty-seventh king of the Mallabhum. He ruled from 1501 to 1554 CE.

References

Sources
 

Malla rulers
Kings of Mallabhum
16th-century Indian monarchs
Mallabhum